Sharon Lou "Kerri" Sanborn (born July 29, 1946) is an American bridge player from New York City. She has won major tournaments as Kerri Davis and Kerri Shuman as well. Sometime prior to the 2014 European and World meets (summer and October), Sanborn ranked 25th among 73 living Women World Grand Masters by world masterpoints (MP) and 7th by placing points that do not decay over time.

As Kerri Shuman during 1974, Sanborn earned the greatest number of masterpoints in American Contract Bridge League-sanctioned play, and thus won the ACBL McKenney Trophy. No woman since then has won the annual masterpoints race, which is now recognized by the Barry Crane Trophy after her longtime masterpoints partner Barry Crane. Sanborn (as Shuman) and Crane won the World Bridge Federation's third quadrennial World Mixed Pairs Championship in 1978. In 1990 she was the only woman invited to compete in a special WBF  for individuals; in effect, an examination set by experts for experts.

Sanborn was inducted into the ACBL Hall of Fame in 2007.

Sanborn was one of 24 women, six from each of four countries (as for men), invited to participate in the SportAccord World Mind Games, December 2011 in Beijing. Her partner was Irina Levitina, at least for the Pairs.

Sanborn and Jack Zhao of China, who sometimes lives and frequently plays in North America, won the 13th quadrennial World Mixed Pairs Championship in Sanya, China, October 2014. Thus she became the first player to win the gold medal twice, and he became the first player from outside Europe and North America to win any medal.

Bridge accomplishments

Awards and honors

 ACBL McKenney Trophy, 1974
 ACBL Hall of Fame, 2007

Wins

 Venice Cup (2) 1989, 1993 
 World Mixed Pairs Championship (2) 1978, 2014
 North American Bridge Championships (20)
 Rockwell Mixed Pairs (2) 1975, 1982 
 Whitehead Women's Pairs (1) 1972 
 Smith Life Master Women's Pairs (1) 2003 
 Machlin Women's Swiss Teams (6) 1989, 1990, 1993, 2001, 2007, 2012 
 Wagar Women's Knockout Teams (5) 1978, 2003, 2005, 2008, 2010 
 Sternberg Women's Board-a-Match Teams (2) 2006, 2008 
 Chicago Mixed Board-a-Match (3) 1980, 1987, 1990

Runners-up

 Venice Cup (2) 1995, 2009 
 World Mixed Pairs Championship (1) 1986
 North American Bridge Championships
 Rockwell Mixed Pairs (4) 1971, 1974, 1977, 2008 
 Whitehead Women's Pairs (1) 2002 
 Blue Ribbon Pairs (1) 1987 
 Smith Life Master Women's Pairs (2) 1985, 1986 
 Machlin Women's Swiss Teams (3) 1983, 2008, 2013 
 Wagar Women's Knockout Teams (3) 1974, 1986, 2014 
 Sternberg Women's Board-a-Match Teams (2) 2001, 2002 
 Chicago Mixed Board-a-Match (1) 1994 
 Reisinger (1) 1989

References

External links
  – with video interview
 
 Women Stars at the World Bridge Federation – with biographies (Sanborn)
 SANBORN Sharon (kerri) athlete information at the 1st SportAccord World Mind Games (2011)

1946 births
American contract bridge players
Venice Cup players
Sportspeople from New York City
Living people
Place of birth missing (living people)